Geneva model may refer to:

 Presbyterian polity
 "Geneva Hand Hygiene Model", a hospital protocol pioneered by Didier Pittet